Events in the year 1924 in India.

Incumbents
 Emperor of India – George V
 Viceroy of India – The Earl of Reading

Events
 National income - 29,930 million
 12 January – Gopinath Saha shoots a man he erroneously thinks is a Police commissioner of Calcutta, Charles Augustus Tegart – he is arrested soon after.
 January - Bombay textile mill strike by communists began.
 February – Mohandas Gandhi is released prematurely on medical grounds.
 30 March - Commencement of Vaikom Satyagraha (the first ever struggle against apartheid in the World) designed by T K Madhavan and Sree Narayana Guru in Kerala, South India.
 July - Great Flood at Kerala – Great flood of 99
 9–11 September – 1924 Kohat riots.
 17  September - 21 days long fasting by Mahatma Gandhi for Hindu - Muslim unity.
 4 December – The Gateway of India in Bombay, built to commemorate the visit of King George V and Queen Mary in December 1911, is opened by the Viceroy, the Earl of Reading.
 Reorganization of the Muslim League by Muhammad Ali Jinnah.

Law

Births
1 January – Kamala Markandaya, novelist and journalist (died 2004).
4 January – Sebastian Kappen, priest and theologian (died 1993)
27 January – Sabu Dastagir, actor (died 1963).
21 February – Krishna Prakash Bahadur, writer (died 2000).
2 March – Gulshan Rai, film producer and distributor (died 2004).
19 March – F. C. Kohli, industrialist (died 2020)
3 June -  M. Karunanidhi, former chief minister of Tamil Nadu, poet, orator (died 07 August 2018 in Chennai, Tamil Nadu, India).
6 June – S. R. Bommai, politician and Chief Minister of Karnataka (died 2007).
1 July – Jan Azam, Pakistani sports shooter
3 July – Arjun Naidu, first-class cricketer (died 2000)
6 July – Mahim Bora, Indian writer and educationist (died 2016)
22 August – Harishankar Parsai, Hindi satirist and humorist (died 1995)
18 September – M. R. Schunker, naval officer (died 2021)
13 October – Moturu Udayam, women's activist (died 2002)
29 November – Parassala B. Ponnammal, Carnatic musician (died 2021)
14 December – Raj Kapoor, actor and director (died 1988).
24 December – Narayan Desai, pacifist and writer. (died 2015)
25 December - Atal Bihari Vajpayee, Poet, reporter, Former PM of India (died 2018)
24 December – Nissim Ezekiel, poet, playwright and art critic (died 2004).
24 December – Mohammed Rafi, playback singer (died 1980).
unknown date
Mahendra Raj, structural engineer (died 2022)
P. K. Venugopalan Nambiar, agricultural scientist (died 1996).

Deaths
Chattampi Swamikal, Hindu sage and social reformer (born 1853).
Kumaran Asan, a poet of Malayalam – the language of Kerala – attained eternity in a boat accident at Pallana river, near Thrikkunnappuzha, Harippad, in Kerala, Southern India.

References

 
India
Years of the 20th century in India